Rosmini Gaels GAA Club are based in Drumcondra, within a stone's throw of Croke Park and have been involved in the Dublin GAA scene since their foundation in 1969. Rosmini currently compete in the Dublin Junior 2 Club Football Championship.

History

Founded by their Club President, Noel McLoughlin, then caretaker of Pobalscoil Rosmini on Grace Park Road, with the help of past and then-present pupils of the school, the club was set up to provide an outlet for Football and Hurling for children and adults of the Drumcondra and greater Dublin 9 area and at the outset was involved at Underage, Minor, Under 21 and Adult Junior level.

Major success was first achieved at Minor and Under 21 level in 1983/84, with members of those teams, such as Cormac Day, Paddy Flynn and Bernie O'Toole, still playing with the current Junior team.

In 1984/85 Philip McElwee, a teacher in Rosmini School, took over the management and coaching of the adult team and in 1985 made a Junior Football clean sweep, becoming the first club to win the treble of Junior Championship, Junior League, (Division 1), and the Joy Cup. On that treble-winning team were notable inter-county players such as  Brian Ladden, Brian Looney and Jim Woods, (Kerry), Gerry McGovern, (Longford), and Dublin Minor stars in the shape of Paddy Flynn and Paul Redmond.

A number of years in the Intermediate league followed but by the early 1990s Rosmini had slipped down a few divisions until the arrival of Player/Manager Timmy Walsh from Cork. Timmy masterminded a revival in the club's fortunes and secured promotion to Junior Division 2 in 1994,

The following season in 1995 brought even greater success with a Division 2 League title and Parson Cup double. Notably, twelve of the 1985 treble-winning squad were still involved in the successes of 1994/95. The day of the League final against neighbours and close rivals, Whitehall Colmcille, will never be forgotten, not least for the shout from Timmy to Baitsey the goalkeeper (who had just made an impressive solo run out of defence to the half-way line) ordering him to "get back in the goal, you're the goalie 'cos you can't play football"!!! Needless to say, Baitsey never left his line again!

Again in 1996 success continued with victory in the Conlon Cup with lead Rosmini to play intermediate Cup and Junior 1 football, A great achievement for a small club in Dublins city center.

Notable players from 1995 include Paul Baitson (Dublin), Padraig Reilly(Cavan), Mike, Fibarr, Brian, Stephen Carrig (Kerry), Barney Fitzgerald (Dublin), Cormac Day(Dublin), Gary Power (Kildare), Gavin Murphy (Meath), Paddy Flynn (Dublin), Stephen Nolan (Dublin), Seamus Reilly (god only knows!) Mattin McHugh (Mayo) Enda (Galway) Norman Gernan (Dublin).

In the following years, Rosmini Gaels held their own in the upper Junior divisions but a crisis point was reached in 2000/2001 when the club were finding it very difficult to get new players involved. With many bigger neighbouring clubs developing greatly and offering more modern facilities, the club faced closure.

At this point, Joe Hennessy, Vinnie Duffy and Alan Kelly and their colleagues in the Rosmini Committee took the difficult decision to re-grade to the lower Junior divisions, thereby providing Sunday afternoon matches. This bold move proved attractive to both current and a number of new players and succeeded in providing new blood and a new excitement, keeping the club going to this day. Many thanks are due to Kay Hennessy of The Findlater Lounge in Dorset Street whose sponsorship of the club at this point, (and to date), was and is, vital for its survival.

In the past few years Rosmini have remained a force in Junior football despite all of the challenges of a small club and have put together promising Championship, Cup and League runs, coming very close to Cup success when finishing as runners-up in the Duffy Cup Final in 2009.

However, in 2010, Rosmini were again Dublin Football Championship winners, beating a strong Croi Ro Naofa side in the Junior E Final in O'Toole Park on 10/10/10, a date never to be forgotten in the club's history. Amazingly, Seamus Reilly and Cormac Day both played and won a second Dublin Championship medal that day, a full twenty-five years after their 1985 win.

In 2012 Rosmini again tasted success in the Dublin Junior E Football Championship with a 1-8 to 1-5 victory over St Kevins Killians with Reilly again involved as a second half sub to win his third championship medal.

Rosmini are still thriving and are involved in Football League, Cup and Championship competitions, regularly "punching above their weight" and finishing competitions higher placed than many larger rival clubs.

Club Colours/Pitch

Rosmini Gaels colours are black and red vertical stripes and they play their home games in Plunkett's VEC College grounds, Whitehall.

Club Honours

 1983 Murphy Cup Winners
 1983 Junior Football League Division Four Winners
 1984 Parson Cup Winners
 1984 Junior Football League Division Two Runners Up
 1985 Junior A Football Championship Winners
 1985 Junior Football League Division One Winners
 1985 Conlon Cup Winners
 1994 Junior Football League Division Three Runners Up
 1995 Parson Cup Winners
 1995 Junior Football League Division Three Winners
 1996 Conlon Cup Winners
 2009 Duffy Cup Runners Up
 2010 Junior E Football Championship Winners
 2012 Junior E Football Championship Winners
 2015 Junior E Football Championship Runners Up
 2017 Duffy Cup Runners Up
 2017 Junior E Football Championship Runners Up
 2018 Inner City Tournament Winners
 2019 AFL Division Nine Runners Up

References

The Gaelic Athletic Association in Dublin 1884-2000 (2005) Editor and compiler: William Nolan Contributors: Jim Wren, Marcus de Búrca, David Gorry  [2]
Club history Herald article http://www.herald.ie/sport/gaa/rosmini-ready-for-duffy-date-1911921.html

Gaelic games clubs in Dublin (city)
Gaelic football clubs in Dublin (city)